The 2014 season was Albirex Niigata FC (Singapore)'s 11th season in the S.League.

Tatsuyuki Okuyama began the season as the White Swan's new head coach after taking over from Koichi Sugiyama, whose contracted ended after 4 years in charge.

Organised by Albirex Singapore Pte Ltd, in partnership with JAPAN Soccer College; the player selection for the coming season was held in Japan, 16 December at Saitama Stadium 2002 and 19 December at J-Green Sakai Stadium. The selected candidates will either earn a professional contract with Albirex Niigata FC (Singapore) in the S.League, Albirex Niigata Phnom Penh in the Cambodian League or admission into JAPAN Soccer College.

Sponsors

 Main Sponsor: Canon
 Uniform Sponsors for S.League: Yoppy, TDK-Lambda, RAIZZIN, Langrich
 Club Sponsors: COMM Pte Ltd, Mitsubishi Corporation, Kikkoman, Paris Miki, RGF Singapore, Daiho, WINN, SOODE, Kirin, CLEO, Nihon Assist Singapore, Sanpoutei Ramen, aguchi, ProtecA
 Apparel Sponsor: Mafro Sports
 Club Albirex: JTB, TAWARAYA, Shogakukan Asia, Konohana Kindergarten, Niigata Kenjinkai Singapore, Keihin Multi-Trans (S) Pte Ltd, IKYU, Hitachi, Taiyou Kouhatsuden Mura, IPPIN, CROWNLINE Singapore, Samurice, Porterhouse, NIKKEI, Zipan Resort Travel

S.League Results

S.League table

Singapore Cup
Albirex Niigata (S) is drawn with Svay Rieng from the Cambodian League in the Preliminary Round of the Singapore Cup. The draw was made on 3 May 2014 at Jalan Besar Stadium. The tie took place on 28 May 2014. The White Swans won the Cambodian side 3-0, knocking them out of the competition. Over the 2-legged Quarter-Finals, Albirex lost 3-4 and 1-2 to Brunei DPMM, resulting in their exit.

Singapore League Cup

Albirex Niigata (S) came in 3rd in the 2013 S.League, hence were placed in Pot A together with Tampines Rovers, Home United and Balestier Khalsa. The draw took place at Jalan Besar Stadium on 20 June 2014. The White Swans were drawn into Group A; playing away to Tanjong Pagar United on 7 July 2014 and home to Police Sports Association on 10 July 2014. Albirex lost 4-0 to the Jaguars followed by the trashing of NFL side 13-0. Their next opponent in the Quarter-Final would be Geylang International. The game was played on 18 July 2014 at Jalan Besar Stadium. Former defender Kento Fukuda scored the opening goal in the 20th minute which the first half ended at 1-0 to the Eagles. 9 minutes after the break, Argentinian striker Leonel Felice doubled the lead. Former Eagle Norihiro Kawakami pulled one back on the 70th minute, but a late Hafiz Nor strike sealed the victory for Geylang, putting Albirex out of the competition.

Squad statistics

Transfers

In

Out

Loan in

Team Staff
Team Manager:  Yeo Junxian
Coach:  Tomoaki Sasaki
Goalkeeper Coach:  Mizuki Ito
Trainer:  Kohei Tanaka

References

Albirex Niigata Singapore FC seasons
Singaporean football clubs 2014 season